Kurs or KURS may refer to:

 Kurs (tribe), one of the extinct Baltic tribes that later formed the Latvian nation
 KURS, a radio station broadcasting at 1040 AM in San Diego, California
 Kurs (docking navigation system), an automatic docking navigation system for the Soyuz-TM spacecraft

See also
 Kinetic energy recovery system (KERS)